Twin Peaks Wilderness is a  wilderness area in the Wasatch Range of Uinta-Wasatch-Cache National Forest in Salt Lake County, Utah, United States. The Mount Olympus Wilderness is directly north of the Twin Peaks Wilderness and separated by Utah State Route 190. The Lone Peak Wilderness is directly to the south and separated by Utah State Route 210.

See also
 List of U.S. Wilderness Areas
 Wilderness Act

References

External links

Protected areas established in 1984
Protected areas of Salt Lake County, Utah
Wasatch-Cache National Forest
Wilderness areas of Utah
1984 establishments in Utah